The M-56 Howitzer is a 105mm artillery gun from Serbia and Bosnia and Herzegovina. Early towed version is comparable to the German 10.5 cm leFH 18 and the American M101 howitzer while newer M-56A1 and self propelled M-09 Soko has more improvements and greater range.

History
The gun's design is based on the M101 and leFH 18. The gun's initial model was the SH-1, designed by the Military Technical Institute Belgrade, Yugoslavia, in 1951. It was produced by Crvena Zastava in Kragujevac, now Zastava Arms. Second prototype, also developed by Military Technical Institute Belgrade, in 1955 designated as SH-2 was basis for serial M-56. Serial production started in 1956 Bratstvo Novi Travnik because prior to that in 1945 decision was made by communist government of Socialist Federal Republic of Yugoslavia to move factories from Serbia to other parts of newly formed Yugoslavia in order to develop their industries. Because of that decision in 1951 Zastava Arms factory, then called Crvena Zastava, was partially dissembled (including complete Crvena Zastava factory artillery program with calibers over 20 mm) and together with 250 experts was transferred to Bosnia into new Bratstvo Novi Travnik factory from then Socialist Republic of Serbia to Socialist Republic of Bosnia and Herzegovina to help in Bosnia development at cost of Serbia who in that time was heavy industrialized and had educated technical staff. The original production version was 28 caliber with a maximum range of 13 km.

Technical data M-56
 M-56 caliber 28
 Weight: Between 2,190 kg
 Min. reach: 2,000m
 Max. reach: up to 14 km
 Muzzle brake: Double
 Min. elevation: -180 mils
 Max. elevation: 1200 mils
 Horizontal limits: 462 thousandths
 Frequency of fire: 6 round/min
 Range M-56: 13.1 km

Later development
MTI developed the M56A1 version, with a longer 33 caliber barrel designed to last for at least 18,000 shots, with a stronger breechblock, with  recoil systems that allow it to fire modern rounds up to 18 km and a hydro-pneumatic balancer. The M-56A1 and M09 Soko Self-propelled artillery are offered by Yugoimport and the M-56 by BNT TMiH in Bosnia.

Technical data M-56A1 105mm
 M-56A1 caliber 33
 Weight: 2,370 kg
 Min. reach: 2,000m
 Max. reach: up to 18.5 km
 Muzzle brake: Double
 Min. elevation: -180 mils
 Max. elevation: 1200 mils
 Horizontal limits: 462 thousandths
 Frequency of fire: 6-8round/min
 M-56A1: 18.1 km
 Length of barrel: 3500mm

M-09 Soko 105mm self-propelled gun

The M-09 Self propelled 105mm gun has direct and indirect shooting capabilities. It can carry up to 60 rounds. It can be mounted on various truck chassis including TAM, FAP, TATRA, KAMAZ and Mercedes models.
 Range: 15.1 km M02 HE ERBT 18.4 km M02 HE ERFB/BB 
 Rate of fire: 6-8 rsd/min
 Armour STANAG 4569 level I
 Zastava Arms M87 - 12.7x108 mm for defense
 Integrated fire control system
 An use ammunition developed for the US M101 and M-56A1 howitzer

Users

According to the United Nations, some 1,500 units of the M56, in its various models, have been produced and over 200 were exported between 1998 and 2004.

The M56 is known to be in service with the following nations:
  - 56 
 
 
  - 72 in 1998
  - 14 in reserve in 1998. 18 
  - 56 in 1998
  - 10 in 1998
  - fielded during the Iran-Iraq War and Persian Gulf War, former operator
  - 24 with the Army and 8 with the Naval Infantry Corps in 1998
  - unknown number in used with the Army
  - 256 in 1998

References

External links

 America Militar: Photos of the M56 in use
 Máquina de Combate: Yugo Import moderniza el howitzer M56
 Partner 2013 fair in Belgrade: Soko M09

Artillery of Yugoslavia
Howitzers
105 mm artillery
Self-propelled artillery
Wheeled self-propelled howitzers
Self-propelled howitzers of Serbia
Artillery of Serbia
Military equipment introduced in the 1950s